Libertarian civil disobedience dates back at least as far as Henry David Thoreau, who was arrested for refusing to pay the poll tax. Dick Clark opines, "I do not think that most libertarians ought to pull up stakes and abandon their gainful employment only to throw their bodies into the cogs of the state. However, when the state comes roaring towards your home, it is heroism to dig in, stand firm, and resist for as long as possible." Manuel Lora has argued against libertarian "martyrdom." It has been argued that a libertarian civil disobedient "should not plead guilty, but should defend himself in court, in order to allow the possibility of changing the unjust law."

Instances 
In 1844, Lysander Spooner, an anarchist and legal theorist, created the American Letter Mail Company which competed with the United States postal service until the company went bankrupt after a series of legal challenges by the government.

In June 2002, Libertarian Party political director Ron Crickenberger was arrested for an illegal protest at the Department of Justice. In 2004, presidential candidate Michael Badnarik was arrested for protesting his exclusion from the debates. In 2005, New Hampshire Libertarian Russell Kanning attempted to board a flight without complying with Transportation Safety Administration (TSA) security screening procedures. Michael Fisher gave an unlicensed manicure to protest nail file regulations in the state of New Hampshire.

The Marijuana Policy Project has organized several acts of civil disobedience. These efforts have included posting cease and desist letters at Drug Enforcement Administration buildings and smoking cannabis at Congressional offices. In at least one instance, the charges were dropped.

Many activists with the Free State Project have been arrested for various offenses. For instance, home-schooling mother Kathryn Dillon withheld from her Keene, New Hampshire property tax payments that portion that would have gone to the public school system budget, instead donating it to charity. Joseph Haas was arrested for allegedly sending an email to the Lebanon, New Hampshire city councilors stating, "Wise up or die."

References 

Civil disobedience
Controversies within libertarianism